The 1965–66 Detroit Red Wings season saw the Red Wings finish in fourth place in the National Hockey League (NHL) with a record of 31 wins, 27 losses, and 12 ties for 74 points. They defeated the Chicago Black Hawks in six games in the semi-finals before falling to the Montreal Canadiens in the Stanley Cup Final, also in six games. The Red Wings would not appear in the Final again until the 1995 Final.

Offseason

Regular season

Final standings

Record vs. opponents

Schedule and results

Player statistics

Regular season
Scoring

Goaltending

Playoffs
Scoring

Goaltending

Note: GP = Games played; G = Goals; A = Assists; Pts = Points; +/- = Plus-minus PIM = Penalty minutes; PPG = Power-play goals; SHG = Short-handed goals; GWG = Game-winning goals;
      MIN = Minutes played; W = Wins; L = Losses; T = Ties; GA = Goals against; GAA = Goals-against average;  SO = Shutouts;

Playoffs

Draft picks
Detroit's draft picks at the 1965 NHL Amateur Draft held at the Queen Elizabeth Hotel in Montreal, Quebec.

Awards and honors

References
 Red Wings on Hockey Database

Detroit
Detroit
Detroit Red Wings seasons
Detroit Red Wings
Detroit Red Wings